Stary Ukyrchelon (Ükher shuluun) is a rural locality (a selo) in Dzhidinsky District, Republic of Buryatia, Russia. The population was 49 as of 2010. There is 1 street.

Geography 
Stary Ukyrchelon is located 30 km southwest of Petropavlovka (the district's administrative centre) by road. Tokhoy is the nearest rural locality.

References 

Rural localities in Dzhidinsky District